Lyclene obtusilinea is a moth of the subfamily Arctiinae. It was described by Jeremy Daniel Holloway in 2001. It is found on Borneo. The habitat consists of upper montane forests.

The length of the forewings is 10–11 mm for males and 12–13 mm for females.

References

Nudariina
Moths described in 2001
Moths of Asia